Hotel Californian may refer to:

Hotel Californian (Fresno, California), listed on the National Register of Historic Places in Fresno County, California
Hotel Californian (San Francisco, California), listed on the National Register of Historic Places in San Francisco, California

See also
Hotel California (disambiguation)